Norville is a commune in the Seine-Maritime département of the Haute-Normandie region of northern France.

It may also refer to:

Places
 Norville, Queensland, a suburb of Bundaberg in Queensland, Australia
 La Norville, is a town and a commune in the Essonne département, in the French region of Île-de-France
 Norville, Missouri, a community in the United States

People
 Deborah Norville (b. 1958), American television broadcaster and journalist
 Jason Norville (b. 1983), Trinidadian soccer player
 Kenneth Norville (Red Norvo, 1908–99), American jazz musician

Fictional characters
 Kitty Norville, main character in a series of novels by Carrie Vaughn
 Norville "Shaggy" Rogers, a character in the animated television series Scooby-Doo
 Norville, an animated bird in the PBS series Clifford's Puppy Days
 Ian Norville